Kanniyar Kali (Malayalam: കണ്യാർകളി) is a folk dance ritual performed in Temples of villages in Alathur and Chittur Taluk of Palakkad district of Kerala. The event is usually a part of Vishu celebrations of the village and usually succeeds the Vela ( Village Fair) and is usually performed during the months of April and May. It is an agricultural festival dance of Nair community. Kanniyar Kali, despite the name of the Virgin, does not have anything to do with the Kannaki cult.  
 Kanniyar Kali is in no way connected with the Kaniyar community, a community of authentic astrologers of Kerala.

The Dance 
The dance is performed at night and ends at dawn and is conducted for four consecutive nights .In certain villages it is conducted only for three consecutive nights.

The dances start every night with the men of the community gathering in the temples and performing a rhythmic circular dance called vattakali (vattakali literally means a circular dance). The vattakali is followed by several 'puraattu', which literally means farce. The purattu does not have a standard format and each purattu lasts for an hour approximately. The purattu depicts the life and social customs of various castes and tribes of medieval Kerala and Tamil Nadu. Since the purattu depict various heterogeneous castes and tribes, the various purattus have different costumes, style of dancing and songs with different tempos. Certain purattu which depict fierce tribes or warrior tribes have performances resembling stick fights and martial movements whereas certain other purattus have slow and rhythmic movements. Certain purattus are laced with humor and depict a scenario wherein a long lost husband and wife have a reunion.

It is performed in a specially made square stage called as pandal. The pandal is located in front of the temple or its premises. It consists of a lighted lamp in the centre and consists of a roof supported by nine pillars. The singers occupy the central position of the stage and the dancers dance along the periphery of the pandal in a circular manner.

The songs are mostly in Malayalam and certain purattus have songs in which there is a heavy influence of Tamil.

The accompanying instruments are the Elatalam, Chenda and the chengalam. Maddalam is an accompaniment in vattakali.

The participants are solely men and women are represented by cross-dressing men who imitate the body language and way of speaking of women.

In the last decade, women have made their debut Kanyarkali performance in a  Desappanthal at Kakkayur.

References

External links 

Old (1966) KanyarKali Announcement
2012 Tattamangalam Kanyarkali photos
1992 Tattamangalam Kanyar Kali
 Girijavallabhan Blog on Kanyarkali
Kanniyaar Kali at Tattamangalam
Purattu acts in Kanniyaar Kali
Introducing Porrattu
Images of Porratu dances performed at Sreekurumba Temple, Tattamangalam, Palakkad
li Photos]

Hindu festivals in Kerala
Arts of Kerala
Folk festivals in India
Dance festivals in India
Festivals in Palakkad district
April observances
May observances